René Schwall (born 29 January 1971) is a German sailor. He competed in the 2000 Summer Olympics. In the Tornado World Championships, which are organized by the International Sailing Federation, Schwall has won three gold medals, ranking him as a world champion during 1993, 1997, and 2000. He has also been awarded two silver and two bronze medals for other years in the Championships. He is currently ranked as the fourth most awarded Tornado medalist in open sailing. Schwall was born in the German town of Kiel, where the first Tornado World Championships were held since 1968, three years before his birth.

References 

1971 births
Living people
Sportspeople from Kiel
German male sailors (sport)
Sailors at the 2000 Summer Olympics – Tornado
Olympic sailors of Germany
Olympic bronze medalists for Germany
Olympic medalists in sailing
Medalists at the 2000 Summer Olympics
Tornado class world champions
World champions in sailing for Germany